

Residential

Single-family detached 

Examples of single-family detached house types include:
 Bungalow
 Central-passage house (North America)
 Chattel house (Caribbean) 
 Cottage (various)
 Courtyard house (various)
 Konak (Asia)
 Log house (various)
 Mansion (various)
 Housebarn (various)
 Split level home (various)
 Upper Lusatian house (Europe)

Single-family attached (small multi-family) 

 Duplex, semi-detached, double-decker, or two-family
 Triplex, triple-decker or three-family
 Quadplex, quadruple, or four-family
 Townhouse or terraced house

Large multi-family (apartments/flats/condos) 

 Garden or walk-up apartments: 1–5 stories, 50–400 units, no elevators
 Mid-rise apartments/condos: 5–9 stories, 30–110 units, with elevators
 High-rise apartments/condos: 9+ stories, 100+ units, professionally managed
 Special-purpose group housing
Retirement home
Nursing home
Dormitory

Public 
 Official residence
 Palace
Archbishop's Palace
Bishop's Palace
Electoral Palace
Episcopal Palace
Presidential palace
Residenz

Commercial 

Commercial buildings, generally, are buildings used by businesses to sell their products to consumers.

Office 
Office buildings are generally categorized by size and by quality (e.g., "a low-rise Class A building")

Office buildings by size
Low-rise (less than 7 stories)
 Mid-rise (7–25 stories)
High-rise (more than 25 stories), including skyscrapers (over 40 stories)
Office buildings by quality
 Trophy or 5-star building: A landmark property designed by a recognized architect
 Class A or 4-star building: Rents in the top 30-40% of the local market; well-located; above-average upkeep and management; usually older than a trophy/5-star building
 Class B or 3-star building: Rents between Class A and Class C; fair-to-good locations; average upkeep and management
 Class C or 2-star building: Rents in the bottom 10-20% of the local market; less-desirable locations; below-average upkeep and management
1-star building: Does not meet the needs of typical tenants; may be obsolete and/or in need of significant renovation

Retail 
Retail buildings are categorized by their configuration and size

Non-freestanding (also known as shopping malls)
Super-regional shopping center: enclosed space; 800,000+ sqft; 5+ anchor stores with other tenants that sell a very large variety of goods
Regional shopping center: enclosed space; 400,000–800,000 sqft; 1–5 anchor stores with other tenants that sell a large variety of goods
Community shopping center: open space; 125,000–400,000 sqft; provides general merchandise and commodities (e.g., supermarket, discount department store)
Neighborhood shopping center: open space; 3,000–125,000 sqft; provides commodities to nearby neighborhoods (e.g. drug store)
Strip or convenience shopping center: open space; less than 30,000 sqft; located along suburban transportation arteries on shallow land parcels; a strip may be configured in a straight line, or have an "L" or "U" shape
Lifestyle center: "Main Street" concept with pedestrian circulation in core and vehicular circulation along perimeter; upscale national chain specialty stores, dining or entertainment (e.g. The Grove, Los Angeles, CA; Americana at Brand, Glendale, CA)
Freestanding: any stand-alone retail structure that is not part of a complex
Big box: freestanding category-dominant retailer; 50,000+ sqft (e.g. The Home Depot, Target, Walmart)
Power center: among the largest types of retail properties; 3+ big box anchor stores; multiple large buildings with parking lot in front and loading in back; smaller retailers usually clustered in a community shopping center configuration
Retail outlet: manufacturers' outlet stores; 50,000–400,000 sqft
Pop-up retail: a retail location designed to only be in a location temporarily (e.g., a retail store that only opens during a holiday season)

Hotels 

Full service hotels
Travelers' hotels
Motel
Choultry
Caravanserai
Extended stay hotels
Boutique hotels
Casino
Resort

Special-purpose 

Bar (establishment)
Self-storage
Car washes
Theme or amusement parks
Bowling alleys
Marinas
Theaters
Funeral homes

Industrial 

Industrial buildings are primarily used for the production and storage/distribution of goods, among other uses.

Manufacturing 

Light manufacturing
Heavy manufacturing

Warehouse/distribution 

Warehouses
Bulk
Cold/cool/refrigerator/freezer storage
High-cube
Warehouse store
Distribution/fulfillment centers
Container terminals
Truck

Flex space 

Office building
Laboratory
Data center
Call center
Showroom

Infrastructure

Composting
Desalination plant
Waste transfer
Power generation
Power plant
Thermal power plant
Fossil-fuel power station
Nuclear power plant
Geothermal power
Biomass power plant
Renewable energy power station
Power distribution
Substation
Converter hall
Rotary converter plant
Transmitter building
Dams
Pump house

Agricultural 

Abattoir
Barn
Chicken coop or chickenhouse
Cow-shed
Farmhouse
Granary, Hórreo
Greenhouse
Hayloft
Pigpen or sty
Root cellar
Shed
Silo
Slaughterhouse
Stable
Storm cellar
Well house
Crib
Windmill
Workshop

Institutional 
Medical
Hospital
Nursing homes
Mental hospital
Sanatorium
Educational
Archive
College
Elementary schools
Orphanage
Secondary School
School
University
Nursery school
Civic
Arena (or stadium)
Library
Mudhif: a traditional reed house made by the Madan people of Iraq
Museum
Observatory
Community hall
Religious (Place of worship)
Church
Basilica
Cathedral
Duomo
Chapel
Oratory
Martyrium
Imambargah
Monastery
Mithraeum
Shrine
Synagogue
Temple
Pagoda
Gurdwara
Hindu temple
Mosque
Government
City hall
Consulate
Courthouse
Embassy
Fire station
Meeting house
Moot hall
Parliament house
Police station
Post office
Assembly
Military
Arsenal
Barracks
Bunker
Blockhouse
Citadel
Missile launch facility
Transport
Airport
Bus station
Metro (subway, underground) station
Taxi station
Railway station (or, primarily in US, Railroad station)
Signal box
Lighthouse
Shipyard
Spaceport
Hovercraft
Passenger terminal
Boathouse
Parking garage
Hangar
Other
Aul
Bathhouse
Film studio
Folly
Gym
Shelter

See also 

Outline of architecture

References